Nunggubuyu or Wubuy is an Australian Aboriginal language, the traditional language of the Nunggubuyu people. It is the primary traditional language spoken in the community of Numbulwar in the Northern Territory. The language is classified as severely endangered by UNESCO, with only 283 speakers according to the 2021 census. Most children in Numbulwar can understand Nunggubuyu when spoken to, but cannot speak it themselves, having to reply in Kriol. To counter this, starting in 1990, the community has been embarking on a revitalisation programme for the language by bringing in elders to teach it to children at the local school.

Classification
The classification of Nunggubuyu is problematic. Heath (1997) postulates that Nunggubuyu is most closely related to Ngandi and Anindilyakwa. However, Evans (2003) believes that the similarities are shared retentions rather than shared innovations, and that Nunggubuyu is closest to the eastern Gunwinyguan languages.

Brett Baker (2004) demonstrates that Ngandi and Wubuy form an "Eastern Gunwinyguan" subgroup as distinct from the "jala"/"Rembarngic" subgroup which includes Rembarrnga and Ngalakgan. Furthermore, Van Egmond's (2012) study of the genetic position of Anindilyakwa supports Heath's hypothesis that Ngandi, Anindilyakwa and Wubuy/Nunggubuyu do constitute one subgroup within Gunwinyguan.

Phonology

Consonants

 is rare.  may optionally be pronounced as a trill when it occurs word-initial position, which is rare.

Vowels

Numbers
Nunggubuyu uses a quinary number system.

Sample text
Ba-marang-dhayiyn
Ba-marang-gagagiyn
B a-marang-dhayiyn
Ba-marang-jaljaliyn
Ba-wan.ngang “hokey pokey”
Badhawawa-rumiyn
Aba dani-yung-bugij
(the Hokey Pokey in Wubuy)

Notes

References

External links
Nunggubuyu language books available in the Living Archive of Aboriginal Languages

Gunwinyguan languages